Sigmund Theodore "Chops" Broskie (March 23, 1911 – May 17, 1975) was a Major League Baseball catcher. He played one season with the Boston Bees for the month of September in 1940.

Broskie was a batterymate of Warren Spahn on the 1941 Evansville Bees. Broskie's veteran leadership was influential on the young pitcher who would go on to become a Hall of Famer.

Broskie's playing career ended in 1942 when he enlisted in the United States Navy.

In 1949, he and his wife, then living in Canton, Ohio, adopted a boy.

References

External links

Boston Bees players
Major League Baseball catchers
Bartlesville Broncos players
Independence Producers players
Buffalo Bisons (minor league) players
Fort Worth Cats players
Wilmington Pirates players
Canton Terriers players
Huntington Boosters players
Welch Miners players
Augusta Tigers players
Charleston Senators players
Evansville Bees players
Bridgeport Bees players
Wilmington Blue Rocks (1940–1952) players
Harrisburg Senators players
Baseball players from Pennsylvania
1911 births
1975 deaths
York Bees players
Youngstown Buckeyes players
United States Navy personnel of World War II